Gimmy Bade (born 1974) is a French football player and coach. He is the nephew of Jean-Pierre Bade.

Career
Bade was born in Réunion. Making his SS Saint-Louisienne aged 19 in 1993, he considers winning the treble- the Premier League, Cup, and Coupe D.O.M. in 2002 to be the apogee of his career.

Accompanied by Jean-Marc Audemar and Benoît Salviat, Bade joined Tanjong Pagar United of the Singaporean S.League for the 2004 season; however, the club had a poor season, coming last for multiple reasons including, as Bade stated, "inexperienced players". The defender even had to convert to the forward position for some games and was offered contracts from other Singaporean clubs following Tanjong Pagar United's disbandment.

References 

1974 births
Footballers from Réunion
Living people
JS Saint-Pierroise players
Expatriate footballers in Singapore
French expatriate footballers
French expatriate sportspeople in Singapore
Association football defenders
French footballers
Singapore Premier League players
Tanjong Pagar United FC players
French football managers
Football managers from Réunion
SS Saint-Louisienne players